Guadiana Valley Natural Park (Portuguese: Parque Natural do Vale do Guadiana) is a natural park in southeastern Portugal. It is one of the 30 areas which are officially under protection in the country.

The top of the flow gage tower was reached by the Guadiana twice in 50 years.

References

External links

Guadiana Valley Natural Park webpage at the Instituto da Conservação da Natureza e da Biodiversidade (ICNB) 

Nature parks in Portugal
District
Geography of Beja District
Tourist attractions in Beja District